John Silva Meehan (6 February 1790 – 24 April 1863) was an American printer and publisher. He was the fourth Librarian of the United States Congress from 1829 to 1861.

Meehan, a United States Democratic party member, was appointed Librarian of Congress by President Andrew Jackson, replacing in the post the Whig-activist George Watterston, who opposed Jackson.  He and his congressional supporters advocated limits on the size of the library. Many of the library's functions were transferred to other government agencies. When a fire destroyed 35,000 volumes in 1851, including two-thirds of the materials originally provided by President Thomas Jefferson, the money provided by Congress for restoration was used solely for replacing lost materials and not for expansion. Meehan did provide a small collection of periodicals for congressional perusal which, under later librarians, became the periodicals division.

Meehan served under nine presidents. Despite congressional opposition, President Abraham Lincoln replaced Meehan with a Republican supporter, John G. Stephenson.

References

1790 births
1863 deaths
Librarians of Congress
American printers
American publishers (people)
19th-century printers
19th-century publishers (people)
People from New York City
New York (state) Democrats
19th-century American businesspeople